Salt Lake Trail is a 1926 American silent film directed by Denver Dixon, and starring Art Mix and Dorothy Lee. It premiered on June 5, 1926, in Rushville, Indiana.

References

American black-and-white films
Films directed by Victor Adamson